Daniher may refer to four brothers, Australian rules footballers
Anthony Daniher (born 1963) 
Chris Daniher (born 1966)
Neale Daniher (born 1961) 
Terry Daniher (born 1957)

and two sons of Anthony Daniher, Australian rules footballers

Darcy Daniher (born 1989)
Joe Daniher (born 1994)